Mateusz Matras (born 23 January 1991) is a Polish professional footballer who plays as a centre back or defensive midfielder for Ekstraklasa side Stal Mielec.

Club career
On 20 August 2020, he signed with Stal Mielec.

Career statistics

Club

References 

1991 births
People from Mikołów County
Living people
Polish footballers
Poland youth international footballers
Poland under-21 international footballers
Association football defenders
Piast Gliwice players
Pogoń Szczecin players
Lechia Gdańsk players
Górnik Zabrze players
Stal Mielec players
I liga players
Ekstraklasa players